Lover   is a 2018 Indian Telugu-language action romantic comedy film directed by Anish R. Krishna and produced by Dil Raju and Harshith Reddy, under Sri Venkateswara Creations. The film features Raj Tarun and debutant Riddhi Kumar in the lead roles. The film was released on 20 July 2018.

Synopsis
Raj, a custom-bike maker, falls in love with Charitha, a responsible nurse. However, they face a challenge in love with Raj to a deadly conspiracy.

Cast  
 Raj Tarun as Raj
 Riddhi Kumar as Charita
 Sachin Khedekar 
 Ajay as Bhai
 Rajiv Kanakala as Jaggu, Raj's brother 
 Praveen as Praveen
 Satyam Rajesh as Nalla Seenu 
 Rohini as Charita's mother 
 Subbaraju 
 Viva Raghav
Satya as Balu

Soundtrack

Reviews

Times of India gave the film 3 out of 5 stars stating, "Raj Tarun and Riddhi Kumar's film is total eye candy". 123telugu also gave the film 3 stars, praising Raj Tarun's performance and the music.

References

External links

2018 films
2010s Telugu-language films
Indian romantic action films
2018 romantic comedy films
Indian romantic comedy films
Indian comedy thriller films
Indian romantic thriller films
2018 action comedy films
2010s romantic action films
Films scored by Sai Karthik
Films scored by Tanishk Bagchi
Films scored by Ankit Tiwari
Films scored by Arko Pravo Mukherjee
Films scored by Rishi Rich

Sri Venkateswara Creations films